Bienvenido N. Santos (March 22, 1911 – January 7, 1996) was a Filipino-American fiction, poetry and nonfiction writer. He was born and raised in Tondo, Manila. His family roots are originally from Lubao, Pampanga, Philippines. He lived in the United States for many years where he is widely credited as a pioneering Asian-American writer.

Biography

Santos received his Bachelor of Arts degree from the University of the Philippines where he first studied creative writing under Paz Marquez Benitez. In 1941, Santos was a government pensionado (scholar) to the United States at the University of Illinois, Columbia University, and Harvard University. He had arrived in San Francisco on October 12, 1941, aboard the  leaving his wife and three daughters in the Philippines. When war in the Pacific came to the Philippines on December 8 (December 7 Hawaii time) he feared he would never see his family again—a reality that "not only interrupted his study of realism; it was overwhelming it" leading to a transformation in his sense of national consciousness and identity. That crisis changed the nature of his writing into a less carefree style to one mixing laughter and pain; described by Florentino Valeros as "a man hiding tears in his laughter."

During World War II, he served with the Philippine government in exile under President Manuel L. Quezon in Washington, D.C., together with the playwright Severino Montano and Philippine National Artist Jose Garcia Villa. Santos left for home on January 17, 1946, aboard the  arriving in early February.

In 1967, he returned to the  United States to become a teacher and university administrator. He received a Rockefeller fellowship at the Writers Workshop of the University of Iowa where he later taught as a Fulbright exchange professor. Santos has also received a Guggenheim Foundation fellowship, a Republic Cultural Heritage Award in Literature as well as several Palanca Awards for his short stories. Scent of Apples won a 1980 American Book Award from the Before Columbus Foundation.

Santos received an honorary doctorate degrees in humanities and letters from the University of the Philippines, and Bicol University (Legazpi City, Albay) in 1981. He was also a Professor of Creative Writing and Distinguished Writer in Residence at the Wichita State University from 1973 to 1982, at which time the university awarded him an honorary doctorate degree in humane letters. After his retirement, Santos became Visiting Writer and Artist at De La Salle University in Manila; the university honored Santos by renaming its creative writing center after him.

Works

Novels
The Volcano (1965)
Villa Magdalena (1965)
The Praying Man (1982)
The Man Who (Thought He) Looked Like Robert Taylor (1983)
What the Hell for You Left Your Heart in San Francisco? (1987)
The Late,Late Show

Short story collections
You Lovely People (1955)
Brother, My Brother (1960)
The Day the Dancers Came (1967, 1991)
Scent of Apples (1979)
Dwell in the Wilderness (1985)
The Old Favorites
The Bus Driver's Daughter
Maligno sa Banga
  Courage (1990's)
The Summer of my 17th YearPiña Colada
Even Purple Hearts

PoetryThe Wounded Stag (1956,1992)Distances: In Time (1983)
"March of Death"Music for OneCome Home, Heroes

NonfictionMemory's Fictions: A Personal History (1993)Postscript to a Saintly Life (1994)Selected Letters: Book 1 (1995)Selected Letters: Book 2 (1996)

Awards, honors and prizes
Rockefeller Foundation Fellowship at the University of Iowa
Guggenheim FellowshipRepublic Cultural Heritage AwardCarlos Palanca Memorial Awards for short fiction (1956, 1961 and 1965)
Fulbright Program Exchange ProfessorshipAmerican Book Award from Before Columbus FoundationHonorary Doctorate in Humanities and Letters, University of the PhilippinesHonorary Doctorate in Humanities and Letters, Bicol University (Legazpi City, Albay, Philippines)Honorary Doctorate in Humane Letters, Wichita State University (Kansas, U.S.)

 See also 

List of Asian American writers

 Critical studies 
As of March 2001:

On Loss: Anticipating a Future for Asian American Studies By: Shiu, Anthony Sze-Fai; MELUS: The Journal of the Society for the Study of the Multi-Ethnic Literature of the United States, 2006 Spring; 31 (1): 3-33.
Bienvenido N. Santos By: Tensuan, Theresa M.. IN: Madsen, Asian American Writers. Detroit, MI: Gale; 2005. pp. 273–78
Up from Benevolent Assimilation: At Home with the Manongs of Bienvenido Santos By: Bascara, Victor; MELUS: The Journal of the Society for the Study of the Multi-Ethnic Literature of the United States, 2004 Spring; 29 (1): 61–78.
A Filipino Prufrock in an Alien Land: Bienvenido Santos's The Man Who (Thought He) Looked Like Robert Taylor By: Ty, Eleanor; Lit: Literature Interpretation Theory, 2001 Sept; 12 (3): 267–83.
Bienvenido N. Santos (1911–1996) By: Mannur, Anita. IN: Nelson, Asian American Novelists: A Bio-Bibliographical Critical Sourcebook. Westport, CT: Greenwood; 2000. pp. 317–22
Themes in the Poetry of Bienvenido Santos By: Rico, Victoria. IN: Garcia, The Likhaan Book of Philippine Criticism. Quezon City, Philippines: U of the Philippines P; 2000. pp. 174–96
Filipino Writing in the United States: Reclaiming Whose America? By: San Juan, E., Jr.. IN: Garcia, J. Neil C.; The Likhaan Book of Philippine Criticism. Quezon City, Philippines: U of the Philippines P; 2000. pp. 441–64The Novels of Bienvenido N. Santos By: Grow, L. M.. Quezon City, Philippines: Giraffe; 1999.
Filipino American Literature By: Gonzalez, N. V. M.. IN: Cheung, An Interethnic Companion to Asian American Literature. Cambridge: Cambridge UP; 1996. pp. 62–124You Lovely People: The Texture of Alienation By: Rico, Victoria S.; Philippine Studies, 1994; 42 (1): 91–104.
Marriage in Philippine-American Fiction By: Manuel, Dolores de; Philippine Studies, 1994; 42 (2): 210–16.
Themes in the Poetry of Bienvenido Santos By: Rico, Victoria; Philippine Studies, 1994; 42 (4): 452–74.
Split-Level Christianity in The Praying Man By: Puente, Lorenzo; Philippine Studies, 1992; 40 (1): 111–20.
The Myth and the Matrix in Bienvenido N. Santos' Scent of Apples: Searching for Harmony among Incongruities By: Valdez, Maria Stella; DLSU Dialogue, 1991; 25 (1): 73–86.
The Poet and the Garden: The Green World of Bienvenido N. Santos By: Grow, L. M.; World Literature Written in English, 1989 Spring; 29 (1): 136–145.
Echoes and Reflections in Villa Magdalena By: Vidal, Lourdes H.; Philippine Studies, 1987; 35 (3): 377–382.
Can These, Too, Be Midwestern? Studies of Two Filipino Writers By: Bresnahan, Roger J.; Midamerica: The Yearbook of the Society for the Study of Midwestern Literature, 1986; 8: 134–147.
Modern Philippine Poetry in the Formative Years: 1920-1950 By: Grow, L. M.; ARIEL: A Review of International English Literature, 1984 July; 15 (3): 81–98.
The Christian World-View of Bienvenido N. Santos By: Grow, L. M.; AUMLA: Journal of the Australasian Universities Language and Literature Association, 1983 Nov.; 60: 234–251.
The Midwestern Fiction of Bienvenido N. Santos By: Bresnahan, Roger J.; Society for the Study of Midwestern Literature Newsletter'', 1983 Summer; 13 (2): 28–37.
Augusto F. Espiritu, "Fidelity and Shame: Bienvenido Santos," in Five Faces of Exile: The Nation and Filipino American Intellectuals. Stanford: Stanford University Press, 2005. pp. 139–178.

Footnotes

Citations

References

External links
Bienvenido Santos in infoplease
People: Bienvenido Santos
Immigration blues
Filipino-American literature
A guide to literary criticism on the internet for Bienvenido Santos
Up from benevolent assimilation: at home with the Manongs of Bienvenido Santos by Victor Bascara
Filipino Writers Album
Filipino-American Literature at Emory University
Introduction to Asian Pacific American Literature at the University of Oregon
De la Salle University
Rereading History, Rewriting Desire: Reclaiming Queerness in Carlos Bulosan's America is in the Heart and Bienvenido Santos' Scent Of Apples by Melinda L. de Jesus
Wichita State University

Filipino writers
People from Tondo, Manila
Writers from Manila
Filipino emigrants to the United States
American writers of Filipino descent
University of the Philippines alumni
1911 births
1996 deaths
20th-century American novelists
American male novelists
American novelists of Asian descent
American short story writers of Asian descent
American male short story writers
20th-century American short story writers
American Book Award winners
20th-century American male writers